Pule may refer to:

People

Surname
 Boalefa Pule (born 1990), South African footballer
 Hermano Pule (1815–1841), Filipino religious leader
 Jabu Pule (born 1980), South African football player
 John Pule (born 1962), Niuean artist, novelist and poet
 Katlego Pule (born 1990), South African football player
 Vincent Pule (born 1992), South African football player

Given name
 Pule Lechesa (born 1976), South African author
 Pule Mabe (born 1980), South African politician
 Pule Maraisane (born 1995), South African football player
 Pule Thole (fl. 2014–2016), South African advocate and brigadier

Places
 Pule, Guidong County, a town in Guidong County, Hunan Province, China
 , Indonesia
 , Indonesia

Other
 Pule cheese
 Pule Houser from Histeria!

Surnames of Botswana